Padri is a dialect spoken in the Padar valley in Kishtwar district in the Indian territory of Jammu and Kashmir. It belongs to the Bhadarwahi group of dialects, and is classified as a member of the Western Pahari branch of the Indo-Aryan languages. It is very similar to the Pangwali language of Pangi, Himachal Pradesh.

The Padar valley is about 80 km long, the terrain is rugged and mountainous, and the population is found mainly in scattered hamlets, with the main village being Atholi.

Padri shares a large proportion of its vocabulary with other Western Pahari varieties (like Bhadarwahi, Pangwali and Siraji). There are two genders: masculine and feminine (there is no neuter). Nouns change for case, but not normally for number. However, some nouns do have plurals, which are formed using a variety of strategies:
 'boys'
 'leaves'
 'tongues'
 'girls'
 'walnuts'

Phonology 
P.K. Koul mentions several series of "complex sounds". One such series consists of a consonant + y (for example  'to play',  'apple'), and another one involves a consonant + v (as in  'dog',  'to sort'), but it is unclear whether these are co-articulated consonants (involving palatalisation and labialisation respectively) or merely sequences of two separate consonants. Another set of distinctive sounds (shared with neighbouring Bhadarwahi dialects, where they are even more widespread) involve a combination of a retroflex stop + the lateral l:  ṭ͡lai 'three', niḍ͡l  'sleep', ḍ͡lau 'village'. These often correspond to clusters of a consonant + r in the ancestor language (compare the Sanskrit equivalents of the above three words: trīṇi-, nidrā- and grāma-).

References

Bibliography 

 Originally published in Chandrabhāg Ṭaṭ kī Parvatīya Boliyāṃ [1977].

Languages of Jammu and Kashmir
Indo-Aryan languages
Endangered languages of India